Hearts of Fencing (當四葉草碰上劍尖時) was a 2003 television drama on Hong Kong station Television Broadcasts Limited. The series, targeted at an audience of teenagers and young adults, focused on the lives of students from an international school, with a heavy theme of fencing.

Description

The four-leaf clover is a symbol of hope, faith, love, and luck. One four-leaf clover brings three young adults together.

A group of students, bonded by dreams, interests, and friendship, go through a series of events - bringing them closer together and finding themselves in each other.

There was once a legend of the Four Fencers. They won every fencing challenge and would bring fame to the small school. However, the day before the fencing finals, the Four Fencers disappeared.

The new school year begins and the Fencing Club becomes the talk of the town again with the new members: Ah Lok, Don, Ah Lung, and Ah Yat. The long-forgotten school magazine is also given a whole new look by 5 new members: Lam Lam, Ah Ching, Man Man, Ah Miu, and 13 Mui. With the collision of the two groups, love interests and relationships burst forth.

Ah Lok and Don's constant fighting and vying for Lam Lam's attention becomes a side plot in the series. However, Lam Lam secretly doesn't care for either of them. In fact, she starts to like Ah Yat.

Characters

-Cheng Ga Lam (Race Wong)
Lam Lam is the main female protagonist, with 3 love interests: Ah Yat, Ah Lok, and Don. She drinks soda as a stress-reliever and hiccups at hearing the word "water". Since she was 5, a four-leaf clover has been her good-luck charm.

-Go Ching (Natalie Tong)
Ah Ching dreams of being a professional artist and loves bringing her camera everywhere, taking pictures of people and celebrities. She has a crush on Don, which makes her Lam Lam's love rival.

-Lam Suet Man (Elaine Yiu)
Man Man is a hopeless romantic, constantly with her head in romance novels. She normally wears glasses, but changes her look for Ah Lung.

-Wong Miu Yee (Renne Dai)
Ah Miu is a foodie. She loves to eat and bake cakes, which brings her closer to Fei Cheung.

-Tsui Kam Mui (Kelly Fu)
13 Mui is the school's campus belle with a train of boys desperate for a chance to date her. Her interests include fashion and boys.

-Au Yeung Yat (Lai Lok-yi)
Ah Yat is Ah Lok's older brother. He puts on a lazy act and scrapes by as an underachiever, but he grows to be very responsible and caring.

-Au Yeung Lok (Don Li)
Ah Lok is Ah Yat's younger brother and deemed the cutest guy of the school year. He is an overachiever and an excellent fencer, giving him the position of Fencing Club president. He was one of the many love interests of Lam Lam.

-Gwan Yu Lung (Sam Chan)
Ah Lung is Don's loyal "servant" and childhood friend. He comes from a poor background but willingly follows behind Don.

-Don Chu (Eddie Lee)
Don is Ah Lung's "master". He comes from a rich family, being brought up to be self-centered and materialistic, thinking money can solve everything. He is obviously interested in Lam Lam.

-Leung Guang Cheung
Fei Cheung is a classmate, who takes an interest in Ah Miu because of her eating habits.

Reception
This series has been heavily criticized for its inaccurate portrayal of fencing techniques and scoring methods. For example, one does not slash repeatedly with a foil, and hits should register immediately without delay.

External links
 Official Site
 Review (spcnet.tv)
 TVB Fan Square
 TVB Fan Square
 Hearts of Fencing and Sunshine Heartbeat

TVB dramas
2003 Hong Kong television series debuts
2003 Hong Kong television series endings